Keepsake is the debut studio album by Australian musician Hatchie, released on 21 June 2019, through Double Double Whammy, Ivy League and Heavenly Recordings. The album was preceded by the singles "Without a Blush", "Stay With Me", and "Obsessed".

Release and promotion
On 26 February 2019, Hatchie announced the release of her debut studio album Keepsake alongside a pre-order. The announcement was accompanied by the release of the lead single "Without a Blush" and its music video, as well as spring tour dates. On 2 April 2019, Hatchie released "Stay With Me" as the second single from the album, with a music video also released on the same day. On 16 May 2019, Hatchie released "Obsessed" as the third single from the album also with an accompanying music video. North American fall tour dates were announced the same day.

Critical reception

Keepsake received universal acclaim from music critics. At Metacritic, which assigns a normalised rating out of 100 to reviews from mainstream publications, the album received an average score of 80, based on fifteen reviews. PopMatterss Dave Heaton said, "Keepsake contains nihilism and optimism at once. This tender, overwhelming pop music has a way of feeling like the soundtrack to the end of the world." Michael Watkins of Under the Radar called it "a record destined to sit at the beginning of a promising legacy in years to come, as Hatchie continues to create jangling sonic comfort food far into the future." The Line of Best Fit critic Craig Howieson stated, "Keepsake has an inexplicable familiarity even as it bursts with new ideas. It is a document capable of throwing us into our own pasts, the perfect score for the movies we make in our minds."

LAura Dzubay of Consequence of sound wrote, "The industrial and atmospheric elements of the album all convey a sense of searching and often of rushing away from one thing and toward another. Even the blurred cover image of Hatchie suggests a feeling of constantly being in motion. It is through this searching and continual movement that Hatchie etches her own lines to define her persona through her music, constantly propelling herself and her ideas in new directions and trusting that we'll keep up." DIYs Cady Siregar said Hatchie "writes and wears her heart on her sleeve, half-singing, half-sighing through her songs with wide-eyed candour, shining through such swoon-worthy dream- pop. At some point, you'll wonder if it was Hatchie's heartache and pain that was written about, or your own." Exclaim! writer Chris Gee said, "Keepsake marks an assertive, confident step forward for Hatchie and Pilbeam is well on her way to carving out her own storied path."

Writing for AllMusic, Heather Phares stated that "as Hatchie exceeds the expectations set by Sugar & Spice, Keepsake reflects her growth into an even more confident and varied artist." Under the Radars Lisa-Marie Ferla wrote, "While Pilbeam's gorgeous, dreamy melodies remain her main strength, a longer running time give her space to play with different ideas." In a more mixed review, Pitchforks Arielle Gordon said, "Keepsake is an album filled with small, inspired moments like this, but they don’t add up to much. Sugary but hollow, Keepsake melts like cotton candy, dissolving on impact."

Track listing
All tracks written by Harriette Pilbeam and Joseph Agius, except "Secret", co-written by John Castle.

Personnel
Credits adapted from AllMusic.
 John Castle – production, mixing
 Brian Lucey – mastering
 Joe Agius - design
 Sophie Hur – artwork

Release history

References

2019 debut albums
Hatchie albums
Double Double Whammy albums
Heavenly Recordings albums
Ivy League Records albums